The 1984 season in Swedish football, starting January 1984 and ending December 1984:

Honours

Official titles

Competitions

Promotions, relegations and qualifications

Promotions

League transfers

Relegations

International qualifications

Domestic results

Allsvenskan 1984

Allsvenskan play-off 1984 
Quarter-finals

Semi-finals

Final

Allsvenskan promotion play-off 1984

Division 2 Norra 1984

Division 2 Södra 1984

Division 2 promotion play-off 1984

Svenska Cupen 1983–84 
Final

National team results

Notes

References 
Print

Online

 
Seasons in Swedish football